Surapet  (alias Surapattu, Surapedu) is located in the northwestern part of Chennai, India. Surapet area comes under Madhavaram Taluk, Chennai District of Chennai Corporation. Surapet is surrounded by areas namely, Puzhal in north, Kolathur in east, Puthagaram in south, Puzhal Lake in west.

Locality and neighbourhoods
The neighbourhoods of Surapet consist of Anna Nagar, Villivakkam, Puzhal, Ambathur, Retteri Junction, Kolathur, Lakshmipuram, Senthil Nagar, Perambur, Puthagaram, Madhavaram, Vinayagapuram, and Kadhirvedu It is close to the Grand North Trunk (GNT) Road.

Landmarks Nearby

1.Retteri Junction, Kolathur (2 km)

2.Puzhal Camp, Puzhal  (2 km)

3.Padi Roundabout (4 km)

Transportation

Chennai Metro

The proposed second phase of the Chennai Metro has three lines. Third line is from Madhavaram Milk Colony to Sholinganallur. In that line, the proposed Retteri Metro Station and Kolathur Metro Station are 3 km away from Surapet.

Railway

The nearest railway station is Korattur Railway Station, 5 km away from Surapet. Chennai Egmore Railway Station and Chennai Central Railway Station are the two main railway terminals in Chennai, which are 14 km away from Surapet.

Roads

With the Ambathur Redhills Main Road/Surapet Main Road and Perambur Redhills Road made the surapet very easy to accessible from Puzhal, Ambathur and Retteri Junction.GNT Road is 3 km away and Inner Ring Road is 3.5 km away from Surapet.

Chennai Bypass Road starts from Perungalathur [near Tambaram] on NH45 to Puzhal on NH5. This bypass passes through the Surapet area and ends on the NH5 near to Surapet.

 Chennai Mofussil bus Terminal in Koyambedu is 10 km away.
 Madhavaram Mofussil bus Terminus in Madhavaram roundana is 4 km away.
kilambakkam Mofussil bus Terminus [ Proposed ] near Vandalur is 40 km away.

Bus Stops
Nearby bus stops in Surapet include:

 Surapet bus stop.
 Velammal College stop.
 Puthagram bus stop.
 Kadhirvedu bus stop.

BUS ROUTES : 62 [Redhills - Poonamallee], 62A [Redhills - Ambathur industrial estate], 48P [Puthagaram - Vallar Nagar], 104 [Redhills - Tambaram west bus stand], 142P [Puthagaram - Perambur], S67 [Villivakkam - Kallikuppam]. 113 [Redhills - Guindy Bus Terminus], 242 [Redhills - Broadway].

Areas in Surapet
 Thulukanthamman Kovil Street.
 School Street.
 Britania Nagar.
Sri Ranga Avenue.
JP Nagar.
DG Nagar.
Madhura Mettur.
Bharathidasan Nagar.
Annai Indira Nagar.
Shanmugapuram.
Sivaprakasam Nagar.
Murugambedu.
Kalaivani Nagar.
Ezhil Nagar.
Arul Nagar.

Educational Institutions

 Velammal Matriculation School
 Velammal Engineering College
 Velammal Vidhyashram
 Velammal New-gen School
 Velammal Global School
 Omayal Achi College of Nursing
 Darwin Public School
 Godson Matriculation School

Shopping
 Vasanth & Co - Vinayagapuram.
Reliance Market - Madhavaram.
Reliance Digital - Kolathur.
Reliance Trends - Ambathur.
Saravana Store - Padi.

Water bodies

 Puzhal eri
 Retteri
 Korattur eri

History of Surapet
This area, once a separate panchayat that comes under Puzhal Panchayat, now comes under Chennai corporation, numbered as "24th ward" and it belongs to the Madhavaram constituency.

About 200 years ago people from a village of same name Surapet near Sholavaram migrated to this village due to poverty in their home place and named the same name to this village also.

Included in Chennai District
The city has been growing both in size and population. The number of territorial divisions has grown from 30 with 68 km2 in 1901 to 200 divisions with 426 Sq. km in 2011.The population of the city has gone up from 5.40 lakhs in 1901 to approximately 65 lakhs in 2011.

Therefore, the Government decided to expand the boundaries of the corporation from 174sq.km to an extent of 426 km2 by amalgamating 9 Municipalities, 8 Town Panchayats and 25 Village Panchayats adjacent to the Chennai and issued orders in G.O. (MS) No.256, MA & WS (Election2) Department dated 26.12.2009 and G.O. (MS) No.280, MA & WS (Election) Department dated 09.11.2010.

On 15 June 2011, the Chief Minister of Tamil Nadu submitted a memorandum to the Prime Minister of India to expand the city limits of Chennai by which the Surapet would come under the new scheme.

Since 2011, it is part of Chennai Corporation as Zone 3 and 24th ward.

Surapet was attached to the Chennai Corporation in 2011, aiding in its development.

In January 2018, the state government announced that the district will be expanded to match the boundaries of the Greater Chennai Corporation. This will integrate six additional taluks from Tiruvallur and Kanchipuram districts into the Chennai district. Surapet is disattached from Tiruvallur to Chennai District.

References
http://www.censusindia.gov.in/2011census/censusinfodashboard/index.html

Office of The Registrar General and Census Commissioner, Ministry of Home Affairs, Government of India. 2013. Retrieved 26 January 2014.

Villages in Tiruvallur district